Tricholamia ruficornis is a species of beetle in the family Cerambycidae. It was described by Hintz in 1911, originally under the genus Moechopsis. It is known from Tanzania and the Democratic Republic of the Congo.

References

Lamiini
Beetles described in 1911